The Mizdah Formation is a geologic formation in the Awbari Governorate, southwestern Libya. The unit preserves fossils dating back to the Cenomanian and Turonian stages of the early Late Cretaceous period.

Fossil content 
The formation has provided the following fossils:
Fish

 Carcharias amonensis
 Distobatus sp.
 Onchopristis sp.
 Protopterus sp.
 Chondrichthyes indet.
 Enchodontidae indet.
 Lepisosteidae indet.
 Osteichthyes indet.
 Pycnodontidae indet.

Reptiles

 Simoliophis libycus
 Crocodylia indet.
 Testudines indet.
 ?Sauropoda indet.
 ?Theropoda indet.

Mammals
 Mammalia indet.

See also 

 Echkar and Farak Formations, contemporaneous fossiliferous formations of Niger
 Kem Kem Group, contemporaneous fossiliferous unit of Morocco
 Sannine Formation, contemporaneous fossiliferous formation of Lebanon
 Calcare di Bari, contemporaneous fossiliferous formation of Italy

References

Bibliography 
 

Geologic formations of Libya
Upper Cretaceous Series of Africa
Cenomanian Stage
Turonian Stage
Sandstone formations
Shallow marine deposits
Fossiliferous stratigraphic units of Africa
Paleontology in Libya
Formations